Niall Craig Stott (born 6 February 1981) is a Scottish field hockey player who was a member of the Great Britain and Northern Ireland squad that finished ninth at the 2004 Summer Olympics in Athens. He was born in Dundee.

The midfielder/attacker, who is nicknamed Stotty, Fingers, and Mick Dundee, started playing hockey when he was eleven years old. He cites his friends and family, especially his mother and brother, as being biggest influences on his hockey career. His brother Ross plays for Scotland International squad while his cousin, Craig Strachan, was a senior international. Stott plays club hockey for East Grinstead, as does his brother Ross. Stott has also represented Scotland in ice hockey, but now only plays at club level.

References
  sports-reference
 EHL Statistics

External links
 

1981 births
Living people
Sportspeople from Dundee
Scottish male field hockey players
Olympic field hockey players of Great Britain
Field hockey players at the 2004 Summer Olympics
Field hockey players at the 2006 Commonwealth Games
East Grinstead Hockey Club players
Commonwealth Games competitors for Scotland